Copt Oak is a place in Leicestershire in England.  It is in the North West Leicestershire district, near Bawdon Lodge, Charley and Ulverscroft.

In its name, cop is an old English word for head, i.e. "[be]headed oak" = "pollarded oak".

Features

The Anglican Church of Saint Peter was consecrated in 1837 and was designed by William Railton, who later designed Nelson's Column in London.

For many years the village, north of the junction of the A50 and the M1, was known for its small youth hostel, which is now closed.

Copt Oak is the highest point of the M1, and the site of BBC Radio Leicester's only transmitter on 104.9 MHz FM (V.H.F.), and also the main transmitter of Gem (formerly Heart 106 before January 2011) on 106.0FM.

External links
 Transmitter

Borough of Charnwood
Hamlets in Leicestershire
Mass media in the East Midlands
Transmitter sites in England
North West Leicestershire District